Horizons-3e, also known as IS-H3e, is a high throughput geostationary communications satellite ordered by Horizons Satellite, a joint venture of Intelsat and SKY Perfect JSAT Group. The spacecraft is designed and manufactured by Boeing on the Boeing-702MP platform.

It is the sixth satellite of the EpicNG service, and covers the Pacific Ocean Region from the 169° East longitude. It has a mixed C band and Ku band and was launched in 25 September 2018 on an Ariane 5 rocket.

Satellite description
Horizons-3e was designed and manufactured by Boeing on the Boeing 702MP satellite bus.

It is powered by two wings, with four panels each, of triple-junction GsAs solar cells. The 702MP platform was designed to generate between 6 kW and 12 kW.

Its payload is the seventh high throughput EpicNG deployment. The EpicNG is characterized by the implementation of frequency reuse thanks to a mix of frequency and polarization in small spot beams. Not only applied to the classical HTS Ka band, but also applying the same technique in Ku band and C band. The EpicNG series also keep the use of wide beams to offer high throughput and broadcast capabilities in the same satellite.

History
Horizons Satellite was originally an equal share joint venture with PanAmSat. It ordered its first satellite, Horizons-1/Galaxy 13 from Boeing in middle 2001 and successfully launched it on October 1, 2003. During 2005, PanAmSat was taken over by Intelsat, but the relationship continued and on August 30, 2005, Horizons Satellite ordered a GEOStar-2 based satellite, Horizons-2, which successfully launched on December 21, 2007.

In July 2009, Intelsat became the first customer of the Boeing 702MP  platform, when it place an order for four spacecraft, Intelsat 21, Intelsat 22, Intelsat 27 and the first EpicNG satellite, Intelsat 29e.

On June 7, 2012, Intelsat announced the EpicNG platform. It would improve available bandwidth thanks to the use of frequency reuse and polarization and feature spot and wide beams, enabling high bandwidth and broadcast applications on a backward compatible way. The first two satellites would be Intelsat 29e and Intelsat 33e. On September 4, 2012, Intelsat and Boeing announced that Intelsat 29e, the first EpicNG satellite, would be made by Boeing on the 702MP platform, completing the 2009 order of four such satellites.

In May 2013 Intelsat ordered a further four 702MP-based EpicNG satellites, Intelsat 32e, Intelsat 33e and two as of August 2016 unnamed spacecraft. And in July 2014 a sixth Epic was ordered, Intelsat 35e.

In  a deal that took 18 months, on November 4, 2015 Intelsat and JSAT announced their fourth joint satellite, after Horizons-1, Horizons-2 and Intelsat 15/JCSAT-85, Horizons-3e. It would be the seventh high throughput satellite in the Intelsat fleet, and complete Intelsat EpicNG family of satellites by covering the Pacific Ocean Region with C band and Ku band.

References

Communications satellites in geostationary orbit
Satellites using the BSS-702 bus
Intelsat satellites
Spacecraft launched in 2018
Ariane commercial payloads